Mōsi Keeranār (Tamil: மோசிகீரனார்) was a poet of the Sangam period, to whom 10 verses of the Sangam literature have been attributed, including verse 27 of the Tiruvalluva Maalai.

Biography
Mosikeeranar hailed from Mosur in Thondainadu. Keeran is his familial name. Mosikeeranar was said to be the contemporary of the Chera ruler Thagadoor Erindha Peruncheral Irumporai. He was known as the poet who mistakenly slept on the murasukattil (giant drum cot) of the ruler.

Contribution to the Sangam literature
Mosikeeranar has written 9 verses, including 1 in Agananuru (verse 392), 2 in Kurunthogai (verses 59 and 84), 1 in Natrinai, and 5 in Purananuru, besides the one in Tiruvalluva Maalai.

See also

 Sangam literature
 List of Sangam poets
 Tiruvalluva Maalai

Notes

Tamil philosophy
Tamil poets
Sangam poets
Tiruvalluva Maalai contributors